William Wither Bramston Beach  (25 December 1826 – 3 August 1901) was an English Conservative politician, who served in the House of Commons for 44 years between 1857 and 1901, becoming Father of the House of Commons in 1899.

Birth and education
Beach was the son of former MP for Malmesbury, William Beach (1783-1856) of Oakley Hall, Hampshire and his wife Jane Henrietta Browne (1804-1831), daughter of John Browne of Salperton Park, Gloucestershire. His paternal grandfather was Michael Hicks Beach, ancestor of the Hicks Beach baronets. His paternal cousin was Michael Hicks Beach, Chancellor of the Exchequer. Beach was educated at Eton and Christ Church, Oxford where he excelled as an athlete. He participated in steeple-chases, but was badly injured after falling from a horse in 1852.

Political career 

Beach's political career began in January 1856, when at a meeting chaired in Basingstoke by William Lyde Wiggett Chute, it was decided that he was the desired candidate to stand in the 1857 general election, succeeding the retiring Charles Shaw-Lefevre. He was subsequently elected Member of Parliament for North Hampshire the following year, alongside George Sclater-Booth. Beach would be successfully re-elected five times for the constituency between 1859 & 1880, before the seat was re-organised under the Redistribution of Seats Act 1885. He was consequently elected MP for Andover and held the seat until his death.

In the House of Commons, he spoke little (not making his maiden speech until 1860, almost three years after being elected), but did much hard work in committee and was appointed a Privy Councillor in January 1900. Beach served on the management committee for the Royal Free Hospital, London, from 1858, and the Winchester Diocesan Training School in 1862. He was against the Parliamentary Oaths Act 1866, and was a supporter of the campaign to repeal malt duty, serving as a member of the Central Malt Duty Repeal Association in the 1860s.

Beach was actively involved in the rapidly growing British railway industry, and became a Director of the London and South Western Railway, becoming Deputy Chairman of the railway's Board under the Chairmanship of Sir William Wyndam Portal, 2nd Baronet. When a Masonic Lodge was formed for the staff of the London and South Western Railway it was named Beach Lodge after the Deputy Chairman, who also served as the Lodge's first Worshipful Master.

Private life 
Beach married Caroline Chichester Clevland, daughter of Colonel Augustus Clevland of Tapeley Park, North Devon in Westleigh, on 8 October 1857. They lived at Oakley Hall, which Beach had inherited following his father's death the previous year. The couple had three children: Archibald, Margaret, and Ellice.

He was a J. P. for Hampshire and was also commissioned in the Hampshire Yeomanry Cavalry in 1858. He was made Hon. Major in 1881, and retired the following year. Beach was a member of the Northants Agricultural Society, and served on the building committee for the Basingstoke Corn Exchange, built 1864–65.

Beach was a very active Freemason, having been initiated in the Apollo University Lodge, Oxford, whilst at university. He subsequently became a member of multiple Masonic lodges and Holy Royal Arch Chapters, becoming Provincial Grand Master for Hampshire and Isle of Wight in 1869, and later Third Grand Principal (the third most senior member) of the Supreme Grand Chapter of Royal Arch Freemasons of England.

Death 
On the evening of 2 August 1901 Beach was severely injured when the horse of the Hansom cab in which he was riding stumbled onto an unguarded roadworks trench while attempting to avoid a bus on Parliament Street. Beach and the driver of the cab were thrown onto the road, and Beach was taken, unconscious, to Westminster Hospital. He woke around three hours later, and was noted to have suffered several head injuries, including a concussion and several abrasions. After appearing to slowly recover, he succumbed to his injuries the following night, aged 74. An inquiry was opened into his death the following week, and a verdict of accidental death was returned.

Beach's funeral was held on 9 August at the All Saints Church, Deane, Hampshire. His wife, Caroline, died in 1918, aged 82.

References

External links
 

|-

1826 births
1901 deaths
Members of the Privy Council of the United Kingdom
Conservative Party (UK) MPs for English constituencies
Road incident deaths in London
UK MPs 1857–1859
UK MPs 1859–1865
UK MPs 1865–1868
UK MPs 1868–1874
UK MPs 1874–1880
UK MPs 1880–1885
UK MPs 1885–1886
UK MPs 1886–1892
UK MPs 1892–1895
UK MPs 1895–1900
Road incident deaths in England
Freemasons of the United Grand Lodge of England
Bramston
People educated at Eton College
Alumni of Christ Church, Oxford